The Evolution of Chaos is the third studio album by American thrash metal band Heathen. It is their first album in 18 years since 1991's Victims of Deception. It was released in Japan on December 23, 2009 via King Records, January 25, 2010 in Europe, and on March 31, 2010 in the US via Mascot Records. This album marked the band's first to feature guitarist Kragen Lum, and would be the only one to feature Jon Torres and Darren Minter on bass and drums respectively.

Release 
Heathen had recorded The Evolution of Chaos in 2008 and was originally scheduled for release on July 20, 2009, but was pushed back to late 2009 as more time was needed to complete the mixing process.

Track listing

Reception 

Reviews for the album have been very positive. Metal Rules gave the album a perfect five out of five, calling it an "absolute masterpiece of modern thrash" and "flawless in almost every way". The album has also netted an 8.7 out of 10 on Ultimate Guitar.

Personnel 
David White – vocals
Lee Altus – guitars
Kragen Lum – guitars, backing vocals
Jon Torres – bass, backing vocals
Darren Minter – drums, backing vocals

Additional musicians
Steve DiGiorgio – bass (fretless) on "No Stone Unturned", sitar on "Intro"
Jon Allen – percussion and chimes on "Intro", backing vocals
Gary Holt – lead guitars on "Control by Chaos"
Adam Harrington – narration on "A Hero's Welcome", backing vocals
Juan Urteaga – backing vocals
Rob Dukes – backing vocals
Dean Bardwell – backing vocals
Tambre Bryant – backing vocals
Terry Lauderdale – lead guitars on "Arrows of Agony" and "Silent Nothingness", backing vocals
Alina "Squeak" Hernes – backing vocals

Production
Travis Smith – artwork, layout, design
Juan Urteaga – producer, recording
Alina "Squeak" Hernes – photography
Jacob Hansen – mixing, mastering
Jeppe Anderson – engineering (assistant)

Note 
"A Hero's Welcome" features a voice-over from video game voice actor Adam Harrington, the brother of late guitarist Doug Harrington of Defiance, in which David White was also a member of from 1992 to 1995.

References 

2010 albums
Heathen (band) albums
Albums with cover art by Travis Smith (artist)